Paraburkholderia terricola is a species of bacteria in the phylum Pseudomonadota.

References

terricola
Bacteria described in 2003